Valentina Harizanov is a Serbian-American mathematician and professor of mathematics at The George Washington University.  Her main research contributions are in computable structure theory (roughly at the intersection of computability theory and model theory), where she introduced the notion of degree spectra of relations on computable structures and obtained the first significant results concerning uncountable, countable, and finite Turing degree spectra.     Her recent interests include algorithmic learning theory and spaces of orders on groups.

Education 
She obtained her Bachelor of Science in mathematics in 1978 at the University of Belgrade and her Ph.D. in mathematics in 1987 at the University of Wisconsin–Madison under the direction of Terry Millar.

Career 
At The George Washington University, Harizanov was an assistant professor of mathematics from 1987 to 1993, an associate professor of mathematics from 1994 to 2002, and a professor of mathematics from 2003 to the present.
She has held two visiting professor positions, one in 1994 at the University of Maryland, College Park and one in 2014 at the Kurt Gödel Research Center at the University of Vienna.

Harizanov has co-directed the Center for Quantum Computing, Information, Logic, and Topology at The George Washington University since 2011.

Research 
In 2009, Harizanov received a grant from the National Science Foundation to research how algebraic, topological, and algorithmic properties of mathematical structures relate.

Awards and honors 
Harizanov won the Oscar and Shoshana Trachtenberg Prize for Faculty Scholarship from The George Washington University (GWU) in 2016.
This award is presented each year to a tenured GWU faculty member to recognize outstanding research accomplishments. She was named MSRI Eisenbud Professor for Fall 2020.

Publications 
Harizanov has over 40 publications in peer-reviewed journals, including
V.S. Harizanov, "Some effects of Ash-Nerode and other decidability conditions on degree spectra " Annals of Pure and Applied Logic 55 (1), pp. 51–65 (1991), cited 21 times according to Web of Science

In addition, she has published the following book-length survey paper and co-edited, co-authored book:

V.S. Harizanov, “Pure computable model theory,” in the volume: Handbook of Recursive Mathematics, vol. 1, Yu.L. Ershov, S.S. Goncharov, A. Nerode, and J.B. Remmel, editors (North-Holland, Amsterdam, 1998), pp. 3–114.
M. Friend, N.B. Goethe, and V.S. Harizanov, Induction, Algorithmic Learning Theory, and Philosophy, Series: Logic, Epistemology, and the Unity of Science, vol. 9, Springer, Dordrecht, 304 pp., 2007.

Degree spectra of relations are introduced and first studied in Harizanov's dissertation: Degree Spectrum of a Recursive Relation on a Recursive Structure(1987).

References

External links
 Valentina Harizanov's home page

20th-century American mathematicians
21st-century American mathematicians
Serbian mathematicians
American women mathematicians
George Washington University faculty
American logicians
Year of birth missing (living people)
Living people
University of Belgrade Faculty of Mathematics alumni
University of Wisconsin–Madison College of Letters and Science alumni
20th-century women mathematicians
21st-century women mathematicians
21st-century American women